The Edith Cavell Hospital was an acute hospital serving the city of Peterborough and north Cambridgeshire, east Northamptonshire and Rutland in the United Kingdom. Situated on a greenfield site at Westwood, Peterborough, it was decommissioned in late 2010 and demolished in early 2011.

History

Opened by the Queen in 1988, the £20m hospital was built to complement services provided elsewhere in the city and named after the Norfolk-born nurse and humanitarian, Edith Cavell, who received part of her education at Laurel Court in the Minster Precinct.

The 153-bed facility also contained three wards and a day activity centre for patients with mental health problems. These services were managed independently by the Cambridgeshire and Peterborough Mental Health Partnership Trust, based at Fulbourn Hospital in Cambridge. The Robert Horrell Macmillan Day Centre, which opened in 1991, was located on site and offered palliative care to patients living with cancer. Casualty and maternity services were based at nearby Peterborough District Hospital in West Town.

In 2010, as part of the £300 million Greater Peterborough health investment plan, the city's two hospitals transferred to a single site on the Edith Cavell grounds, with the aim of providing a flexible facility more suited to modern healthcare. The full planning application for the redevelopment of the Edith Cavell site was approved by the council in 2006 and the name Peterborough City Hospital chosen by public competition in 2008. Together with the adjacent mental health unit, known as the Cavell Centre, it now forms the Edith Cavell Healthcare Campus.

See also
East of England Ambulance Service
Healthcare in Cambridgeshire
List of hospitals in England
Shelf (sexual health service), Peterborough

References

External links
Peterborough and Stamford Hospitals NHS Foundation Trust
Peterborough Primary Care Trust
Cambridgeshire and Peterborough Mental Health Partnership NHS Trust
East of England Ambulance Service NHS Trust

Hospital buildings completed in 1988
Buildings and structures in Peterborough
Defunct hospitals in England
Hospitals in Cambridgeshire
Hospitals established in 1988
1988 establishments in England